The resheto is a Ukrainian percussive folk instrument. The resheto consists of a wooden ring with a diameter of up to 50cm (20in). Initially the ring was strung with a sieve rather than a skin tightened over one side. The resheto is struck with the hand or a stick.

Related instruments 
Tambourine
Bubon
Taraban

See also
Ukrainian folk music

Sources

Humeniuk, A. Ukrainski narodni muzychni instrumenty, Kyiv: Naukova dumka, 1967 
Mizynec, V. Ukrainian Folk Instruments, Melbourne: Bayda books, 1984 
Cherkaskyi, L. Ukrainski narodni muzychni instrumenty, Tekhnika, Kyiv, Ukraine, 2003. 262 pages.  

Ukrainian musical instruments
European percussion instruments